Caryatis hersilia is a moth of the subfamily Arctiinae. It was described by Herbert Druce in 1887. It is found in Cameroon, Nigeria and South Africa.

References

Moths described in 1887
Nyctemerina
Insects of Cameroon
Insects of West Africa
Moths of Africa